Daniele Gabriele (born 16 December 1994) is a German professional footballer who plays as a forward for TSV Steinbach.

Gabriele played his first match for VfB Stuttgart II on 25 July 2015 in the 3. Liga against Dynamo Dresden.

References

External links
 

1994 births
People from Leutkirch im Allgäu
Sportspeople from Tübingen (region)
Footballers from Baden-Württemberg
Living people
German footballers
German sportspeople of Italian descent
Association football forwards
SC Freiburg II players
VfB Stuttgart II players
FC Wacker Innsbruck (2002) players
FC Carl Zeiss Jena players
Türkgücü München players
SSV Ulm 1846 players
TSV Steinbach Haiger players
3. Liga players
Regionalliga players
Austrian Football Bundesliga players
2. Liga (Austria) players
German expatriate footballers
Expatriate footballers in Austria
German expatriate sportspeople in Austria